Either Way is an album by Zoot Sims and Al Cohn recorded in Philadelphia in 1961 for the Fred Miles Presents label.

Reception 

The Allmusic review by Scott Yanow stated "It is fun to hear Sims and Cohn work with a vocalist, jamming behind him and launching into their solos. The five instrumentals, which include the riffing "P-Town," the only ballad of the date ("Autumn Leaves") and the heated blues "Morning Fun," are excellent too, making this a set well worth picking up".

Track listing 
 "P-Town" (Al Cohn) – 5:12
 "I Like It Like That" (Max Collie) – 2:26
 "Sweet Lorraine" (Cliff Burwell, Mitchell Parish) – 3:21
 "Autumn Leaves" (Joseph Kosma, Johnny Mercer, Jacques Prévert) – 4:43
 "The Thing" (Al Cooper) – 4:55
 "I'm Tellin' Ya" (Cohn) – 4:47
 "Nagasaki" (Mort Dixon, Harry Warren) – 2:29
 "Morning Fun" (Cohn, Zoot Sims) – 6:15

Personnel 
Zoot Sims, Al Cohn – tenor saxophone
 "Old Grand Happy" (Mose Allison) – piano
Bill Crow – double bass
Gus Johnson – drums
Cecil "Kid Haffey" Collier – vocals (tracks 2, 3 & 7)

References 

1961 albums
Al Cohn albums
Zoot Sims albums